Arthur Thomas (December 10, 1864 – August 8, 1895) was an American baseball catcher and first baseman in the late 19th century, who played for predecessor teams to the Negro leagues. He played for several teams from 1886 to 1891, spending the majority of his career with the Cuban Giants. He also played with the Baltimore Lord Baltimores of the National Colored Base Ball League in 1887.

References

External links
 and Seamheads

1864 births
1895 deaths
Cuban Giants players
New York Gorhams players
Baseball catchers